Sligo Racecourse is a horse racing venue in Sligo, Ireland which stages both National Hunt and flat racing. The course is a right-handed track on a one-mile circuit. Racing has taken place at the course since 1955, although it has taken place locally since 1781.
The racecourse is located in Cleveragh, about 0.75 mile (1 km) from the town, and hosts around eight race days per year.

References

External links
Official website
Go Racing Profile

Horse racing venues in the Republic of Ireland
Sports venues in County Sligo
Sport in Sligo (town)
Sports venues completed in 1955
1955 establishments in Ireland